United States v. Drescher, 179 F.2d 863 (2nd Cir. 1950) was a United States income tax case before the Second Circuit.  The Court held as follows:

The value of the employer-purchased annuities in question was taxable as part of taxpayer's gross income in the year in which the annuities were purchased.
The annuities in question were nonassignable, and possession was retained by the employer until taxpayer reached age of retirement; and the employee's compensation was not reduced during these years, nor did he have election to receive in cash the amount paid.

Facts

A corporation, anticipating its executive's retirement, purchases an "endowment policy," entitling him (the policy-holder) to a lump-sum-certain when he retires in 15 years.

Held

The executive must include the premium immediately, as his "basis" for his new policy.

Academic commentary

The stakes for the government are as follows:
Due to the declining present value of future money, a taxpayer pays less in taxes if he can defer his tax payment.
In the case of this endowment policy:
If the Premium = $B, the [lump sum] will be $[B*(1+i)^Y].
If deferral is permitted, the executive's tax savings = (marginal rate R)*[lump sum]
Reasons in favor of deferral:  it was issued to the company in the interim; and, unlike the stock bonus above, his rights are nonforfeitable: he can't sell/borrow against it, nor can he be denied it by being fired.
Reasons against deferral: it names him as the beneficiary; he should feel better off at issuance—and he certainly consented to the policy purchase in lieu of salary (e.g. as consideration).

References

External links

United States taxation and revenue case law
1950 in United States case law
United States Court of Appeals for the Second Circuit cases
Employee compensation in the United States